Ankazobe is a district of Analamanga in Madagascar.

Communes
The district is further divided into 15 communes:

 Ambohitromby
 Ambolotarakely
 Andranomiely Sud
 Ankazobe
 Antakavana
 Antotohazo
 Fiadanana
 Fihaonana
 Kiangara
 Mahavelona
 Mangasoavina
 Marondry
 Miantso
 Talata-Angavo
 Tsaramasoandro

Infrastructure
Route Nationale 4 from Antananarivo to Mahajanga.
 Route d'Interet Provinciale 40T (RIP 40T) from the RN 4/Ankazobe to Talata-Angavo

Nature reserves
The Ambohitantely Special Reserve is situated at 30 km in the North-East of the town of Ankazobe. It is situated on the territory of the municipalities of Antakavana and Ambolotarakely.

References 

Districts of Analamanga